Alone in the World may refer to:

 Alone in the World (Bouguereau), a  painting by William-Adolphe Bouguereau
 Alone in the World (film), a 1952 French film
 "Alone in the World" (Fringe), a television episode
 Alone in the World (novel) or Sans Famille, an 1878 novel by Hector Malot
 Alone in the World (1881 painting) 1881 Oil-on-canvas painting by Dutch artist Jozef Israëls